Crossnaders are a Dutch electronic music producer and DJ duo who include Shane Muller and Bob Sandee.

Career

In 2014 Crossnaders released their first track "Karambit" on BIP Records. After a year they made a debut on CLUBTRXX with their new single "Akimbo". During 2015 they became a part of Metanoia Music and released a collaboration with Joe Ghost "Frostfire". In 2016 Dyro signed Crossnaders on his music label Wolv Records and the Dutch duo released a collaboration with Tom Ferro "Terror". That year they also worked with Skink Records and released "Cray". The year 2017 was extremely important for Crossnaders. First of all, they signed a contract with Spinnin' Records. Then they released a collaboration with KSHMR "Back To Me". 2018 saw their debut on Smash The House (collaboration with Bassjackers "Last Fight") and Stmpd Rcrds (collaboration with CMC$ "Baller"). Their solo track "Damn Homie" was released on Dharma Worldwide on 31 August 2018.

Discography

Extended plays

Singles

Remixes

Free Tracks

References

Dutch DJs
Spinnin' Records artists
Dutch musical duos